Vyšná Rybnica is a village and municipality in the Sobrance District in the Košice Region of east Slovakia.

History
In historical records the village was first mentioned in 1419.

Geography
The village lies at an altitude of 222 metres and covers an area of 40.082 km².
It has a population of 375 people.

Facilities
The village has a public library and a soccer pitch.

External links
 
https://web.archive.org/web/20071217080336/http://www.statistics.sk/mosmis/eng/run.html 
http://en.e-obce.sk/obec/vysnarybnica/vysna-rybnica.html
http://www.vysnarybnica.sk

Villages and municipalities in Sobrance District